Birangana is the title awarded by the Government of Bangladesh to women raped during the Bangladesh Liberation War by the Pakistan army and their local collaborators.

History 
On 16 December 1971 Bangladesh won its independence from Pakistan through the Bangladesh Liberation war. There was mass rape during the Bangladesh Liberation war with an estimated 200,000-400,000 women were raped by Pakistan Army and their collaborators. On 22 December 1971 the Government of Bangladesh declared women who had been raped Birangana or war-heroine. President Sheikh Mujibur Rahman asked Bangladesh to "give due honour and dignity to the women oppressed by the Pakistani army" and called them his daughters. Yet many of them committed suicide, a section of them left the country to work as servants abroad, and a great many were killed in the hands of the unskilled mid-wives during abortion. This prompted the government to set up seba sadans (service homes) to give them clinical support. Kendrio Mohila Punorbashon Songstha (Central Women Rehabilitation Organization) was established in January 1972 to rehabilitate these violated women with the  technical and humanitarian support from International Planned Parenthood, the International Abortion Research and Training Centre, and the Catholic Church. Later, the government provided them with vocational training and launched a campaign to get them married. Which led to accusations that Bangladesh was trying to hide the Biranganas. The Biranganas have often been ostracised by society and their family members.

Women Rights activists have called for the Birangana to be declared Freedom Fighters (Mukti Bahini). Bangladesh National Women Lawyers Association and Mitali Hossain filled a petition with Bangladesh High Court to upgrade the status of Birangana. On 27 January 2014, the High Court asked the government of Bangladesh why it should not be directed to do so. In January 2015 the parliament of Bangladesh approved a proposal to upgrade the status of Birangana to freedom fighter status. On 23 October 2015 Bangladesh government for the first time declared 43 Birangana, Freedom Fighters. Liberation War Affairs Minister AKM Mozammel Haque said that now they would enjoy the same government benefits as Freedom Fighters. With the latest inclusion in December 2020, a total of 400 Biranganas received the status of freedom fighters. Sixteen Biranganas were added to the list at the 73rd meeting of the National Freedom Fighter Council taking the total number to 416 in June 2021.

Artistic depictions 
  Birangona: Women of War is a play by the British theatre group, the Komola Collective and Leesa Gazi. 
 Ami Birangona Bolchhi (I am Birangona speaking) is a book by Nilima Ibrahim which had several stories that she had collected from rape victims.
 War Heroines Speak is the English translation of  Ami Birangona Bolchi  by Dr. Nusrat Rabbee
 Birangana a Grass Root level organization in South 24 Pgs, India
Seam is a poetry book by Tarfia Faizullah that focuses on rape in the Bangladesh Liberation war and the Birangana.

References 

Courage awards
Aftermath of the Bangladesh Liberation War
Military awards and decorations of Bangladesh
Rape in Asia
Violence against women in Bangladesh